Donald Heins (19 February 1878 – 1 January 1949) was a Canadian violinist, violist, conductor, organist, composer, and music educator of English birth. He notably founded the first professional orchestra in Ottawa, the Ottawa Symphony Orchestra (no relation to the current orchestra of that name), in 1902, serving as its director until 1927. He also served in a variety of positions with the Toronto Symphony Orchestra from 1927–1949, including concertmaster, principal violist, and assistant conductor.

He was highly active as an educator, notably founding the instrumental music program at Ottawa's public school system and teaching on the faculties of the Canadian Conservatory of Music (1902–1927) and the Toronto Conservatory of Music (1927–1948). His compositions include several motets and anthems, some chamber music for string instruments, a small amount of orchestral music, the Saint Ursula Mass for female choir and small orchestra, and two short operettas, An Old Tortugas (1936) and Yellow Back (1939), both of which were commissioned by the Canadian Broadcasting Corporation.

Early life and education
Born in Hereford, Heins was the grandson of a German piano maker who had immigrated to England. He received his musical training in Germany at the Leipzig Conservatory from 1892–1897, where he was a pupil of Richard Hofmann (orchestration), Gustav Schreck (harmony), and Hans Sitt (violin).

Heins returned to England in 1897, where he continued with further musical studies under August Wilhelmj for the next five years. During that time, he played in the first violin section of several orchestras, including those led by Edward Elgar and Hubert Parry. He later studied under Leopold Auer in New York City in the 1920s.

Life in Ottawa
In 1902 Heins crossed the Atlantic to come to Canada, settling in Ottawa. He remained in the capital for the next 25 years, where he was a member of the faculty of the Canadian Conservatory of Music (CCM). The conservatory's founder, Harry Puddicombe, was married to his sister.

Heins notably founded the school's symphony orchestra in 1903 and served as its director through 1927. In 1910 the orchestra was restructured to become the Ottawa Symphony Orchestra. With the orchestra, Heins presented several major symphonies that had never been heard in the city of Ottawa, including works by Ludwig van Beethoven, Antonín Dvořák, Wolfgang Amadeus Mozart, and Pyotr Ilyich Tchaikovsky.

While teaching at the CCM, Heins also held an organist posts at three different Presbyterian churches in Ottawa; a career spanning a total of 23 years. In 1918 he established the first violin training program in Ottawa's public schools, enlisting a group of 14 violin teachers to forward the project. With the success of this program, he went on to establish the school's system's first student orchestra, which gave four concerts annually under his baton. He also spent three years as the conductor of the 43rd Regiment's Royal Artillery Band while in Ottawa.

Life in Toronto
In 1927 Heins left Ottawa for Toronto, where he lived for the rest of his life. He taught at the Toronto Conservatory of Music from 1927-1948, where he notably conducted the school's symphony orchestra from 1930-1934. He also was the violist in the Conservatory String Quartet from 1929-1934. He served as concertmaster of the Toronto Symphony Orchestra (TSO) from 1927–1931, and was then the TSO's principal violist from 1931-1938. He continued to play in the viola section with the orchestra up until his death in 1949.  He was the TSO's assistant conductor from 1931-1942. While in Toronto, he also worked at St Mary the Virgin Anglican Church as their organist. He died in Toronto at the age of 70.

Writings
Technical Devices for Violinists (1942)

Works
Country Dance (1905)
Gloria: Violin and Pianoforte; publ. by Theo. Presser Co. Philadelphia, 1924.
Circus Day: Violin and Pianoforte; publ. by Theo. Presser, Philadelphia, 1924.
Puppet's Dance: Violin and Pianoforte, publ. by Oliver Ditson, Boston, 1924.
The Dutch Family: Violin and Pianoforte (1928)
The Bell Boy Suite: Violin and Piano (1928)
An Old Tortugas (1936), operetta
Yellow Black (1939), operetta
Saint Ursula Mass, mass
The Awakening, symphonic poem
Blest are the Pure in Heart, anthem

References

1878 births
1949 deaths
Canadian classical composers
Canadian male classical composers
Canadian conductors (music)
Male conductors (music)
Academic staff of the Canadian Conservatory of Music
Canadian classical organists
Male classical organists
Canadian classical violinists
Male classical violinists
Canadian classical violists
University of Music and Theatre Leipzig alumni
Canadian music educators
Canadian opera composers
Male opera composers
People from Hereford
Academic staff of The Royal Conservatory of Music
Musicians from Ottawa
Musicians from Toronto
19th-century Canadian violinists and fiddlers
20th-century Canadian violinists and fiddlers
Canadian male violinists and fiddlers
20th-century violists
British emigrants to Canada